Thayannur is a small village situated in the Kasaragod district of Kerala in India. It is located on the way between Kanhangad and Kalichanadukkam. It is situated at the junction of two routes, one towards Kanhangad, and second one towards Nileshwar.

Educational Institutions 
 Govt. Higher secondary school, Thayannur

Places of Worship 
 Sri Mahavishnu Temple, Thayannur
 Holy spirit Church, Ennappara
 Thayannur Juma masjid Thayannur

Famous People 
Kumaran Periya (Teacher, Author),
Thomas Master(Artist),
Jeevan Uthaman, Life Skill Coach | Speaker

Transportation
The national highway passing through Nileshwaram connects to Mangalore in the north and kannur in the south. The nearest railway station is Nileshwar on Mangalore-Palakkad line. There are airports at Mangalore and Kannur International Airport.

References 

Nileshwaram area
Port cities in India
Populated coastal places in India